Jan Zajíček (born 4 March 1977 in Prague, Czechoslovakia) is a Czech film director, screenwriter and artist.

Early life 

Jan Zajíček was born on 4 March 1977, in Prague, Czechoslovakia. He studied fine art at the Václav Hollar School of
Art and film directing at the Film and TV School of the Academy of Performing Arts in Prague (FAMU). In 1992 he began to create graffiti art, one of the earliest graffiti artists in Czechoslovakia (under the pseudonym "Scarf" or "Skarf"). His experience with graffiti later influenced his strongly visual cinematic style, characterised by its combination of live-action with animation and visual effects. Between 1993 and 2000 he was a member of the Czech hip hop group WWW, which played in Prague venues including Alterna Komotovka, RC Bunkr, ROXY, and Rock Café, and in 1996 supported Sinéad O'Connor. During his studies and after graduation, he was a lecturer of experimental audio-visual production at the Josef Škvorecký Literary Academy. Since 2010, he has been a resident at the MeetFactory Contemporary Art Centre.

Career

Music videos 

Zajíček has directed several award winning music videos. His first video, for the song "Známka punku" (The Sign of Punk) by the Czech punk band Visací zámek, was named Best Music Video of the Year by the Czech Music Academy. Other videos that received attention included  "Days Will Never Be the Same", and "Meleme, meleme kávu" (Grinding the Coffee) by Czech hip hop artists Hugo Toxxx and Vladimir 518, which received Filter magazine's award for Best Music Video of the Year, and was selected by the International Short Film Festival Oberhausen for screening during its MuVi programme in 2010.

Theatre and stage design

From 2004 to 2013, Zajíček worked as a director and animator with several theatre groups, including Theatre XXL, VerTeDance, the National Theatre and the State Opera. In 2012, he created video content for the 60 metre screen at the Czech House for the 2012 Summer Olympics in London, United Kingdom. Along with Tomáš Mašín, he was also the co-director of Czech rock band Lucie's 2014 concert tour.

Film 

In 2003 Zajíček produced a short experimental student film, The End of the Individual, a study of the social structure of society on a model of one's own death. The film is a combination of 3D animation and live-action with a non-linear narrative. The film received several awards and was received positively internationally. In 2010, he created the short video montage Polys and contributed to the Czech pavilion at Expo 2010 in Shanghai, China.

He has also directed several commercials (for General Electric, ING, Nike, Skoda Auto, Kia Motors) and co-edited several documentaries. In 2011 he edited a documentary about the impact of corporate psychopaths upon society, and how the overuse of anti-depressants can result in erratic behavior; entitled I Am Fishead, it featured Peter Coyote, Philip Zimbardo, Václav Havel, Nicholas Christakis, Robert D. Hare and Christopher J. Lane. He was a co-creator (with rapper Vladimir 518) of the Czech TV documentary series Kmeny (Tribes), about urban subcultures, and in 2015 he wrote and directed the show's episode about hackers. In 2016 he wrote and co-directed (with the female Czech graffiti artist Sany) a documentary about female graffiti entitled Girl Power, the first documentary on this topic. It starred Martha Cooper, Lady Pink, and others, and was screened at cinemas and festivals all around the globe.

Awards  

 1999 – Eurovideo 99 Malaga - Honorable Mention (won) / Caramel Is Sugar That Will Never Recover
 2002 – FAMU Festival - Best Sound Award (won) / The End of the Individual
 2003 – A. N. Stankovič Award - Solitaire d’Or (won) / The End of the Individual
 2003 – IFF Karlovy Vary - Best Student Film Collection Award (won) / The End of the Individual, shared with V. Kadrnka and H. Papírníková
 2005 – Sazka Dance Award (won) / Silent Talk, VerTeDance
 2006 – Czech Music Academy Award - Best Music Video of the Year (won) / "Známka punku" (The Sign of Punk)
 2007 – Óčko Music TV Award - Best Music Video of the Year (nominated) / "Chvátám" (Rush)
 2008 – Filter Mag Award - Best Music Video of the Year (won) / Days Will Never Be the Same
 2008 – Óčko Music TV Award - Best Music Video of the Year (nominated) / Days Will Never Be the Same
 2008 – Žebřík Award - Best Music Video of the Year (nominated) / Days Will Never Be the Same
 2009 – Filter Mag Award - Best Music Video of the Year (won) / "Meleme, meleme kávu" (Grinding the Coffee)
 2016 – UNERHÖRT Film Festival Hamburg - Best Film Prize (won) / Girl Power

Work

Direction and screenwriting filmography

 2002 – The End of Individual / short
 2003 – Off Off / documentary TV series
 2003 – Operation In/Out (Operace In/Out) / documentary
 2006 – Break My Heart Please! / short dance film series
 2012 – Then And Now / documentary
 2015 – Tribes: Hackers / documentary
 2016 – Girl Power / documentary

Music videos

 1998 – WWW / The Caramel Is Sugar That Will Never Recover
 2005 – Padlock (Visací Zámek) / The Sign of Punk
 2006 – Pio Squad / Rush
 2006 – PSH / The Year of PSH
 2008 – Sunshine / Days Will Never Be The Same
 2009 – Hugo Toxxx & Vladimir518 / Grinding the Coffee
 2011 – Padlock / 50

Edit

 2002 – Elusive Butterfly / documentary
 2008 – The Anatomy of Gag / short
 2009 – Extraordinary Life Stories - Josef Abrhám / TV documentary
 2011 – I Am Fishead / documentary
 2013 – Hotelier / documentary
 2014 – Magical Dramatic Club / TV documentary series

Theatre performances (cooperation)
 2003 – Hypermarket / The National Theatre
 2004 – Eldorado / The National Theatre
 2004 – The Queen of Spades / The State Opera
 2004 – Silent Talk / VerTeDance
 2006 – Break My Heart Please! / Theatre XXL
 2012 – Czech House / 2012 Summer Olympics in London, United Kingdom
 2013 – War with the Newts / The State Opera
 2013 – Krabat – The Sorcerer's Apprentice / The National Theatre
 2014 – The Lucie 2014 Megatour

Festivals and exhibitions 
 2002 – Febiofest, Prague, the Czech Republic (The End of Individual / )
 2003 – Anthology Film Archive, New York City, USA (The End of Individual / )
 2003 – Karlovy Vary International Film Festival, the Czech Republic (The End of Individual / )
 2003 – Dahlonega International Film Festival, Georgia, USA (The End of Individual / )
 2008 – Chelsea Art Museum / Sonicself, New York City, USA (The End of Individual / )
 2008 – Bolzano ShortFilm Festival, Italy (Rush / )
 2008 – Brooklyn Film Festival, New York City, USA (Days Will Never Be the Same) 
 2008 – PechaKucha Night, Prague, the Czech Republic 
 2010 – 56th International Short Film Festival Oberhausen, Germany (Grinding the Coffee / )
 2010 – DOX Centre for Contemporary Art, Prague, the Czech Republic (Polys)
 2010 – Expo 2010, Shanghai, China (Polys)
 2015 – AFO International Festival of Science Documentary Films, Olomouc, the Czech Republic (Tribes: Hackers / )
 Girl Power (2016): Red Gallery London, United Kingdom, Urban Art Fair Paris, France, Cinema L'Ecran Saint-Denis, France, American Cosmograph Toulouse, France, Expo Charleroi Tattoo’moi 1 Graffiti, Belgium, Urban Spree Berlin, Germany, Friedrich Wilhelm Murnau Foundation Wiesbaden, Germany, Milla Club Munchen, Germany, IFZ Leipzig, Germany, Film Festival Essen, Germany, Platzprojekt Hannover, Germany, Culture centrum Kiel, Germany, UNERHÖRT Film Festival Hamburg, Germany, Frameout Film Festival Vienna, Austria, Kuns Festival Oslo, Norway, Helsinki International Film Festival, Finland, Stencibility Festival Tartu, Estonia, International Film Festival 86 Slavutych, Ukraine, Artmossphere Moscow, Russia, Artmossphere Saint Petersburg, Russia, Cultural Institution Krajn, Slovenia, Blart festival, Bosna and Hercegovina, Colombian Urban Art Film Festival Bogota, Colombia, De Cine MÁS Managua, Nicaragua, Redfern Community Centre Sydney, Australia & StayFly Sydney, Australia.

Literature 
 Martina Overstreet: In Graffiti We Trust. Praha: Mladá fronta 2006, 230 pages

References

External links 
 
 Czech-Slovak Film Database
 Jan Zajicek’s videos on Vimeo

1977 births
Czech music video directors
Film directors from Prague
Living people